This list includes all 27 confirmed impact craters in Australia as listed in the Earth Impact Database.

Impact craters - confirmed

Unconfirmed impact craters 

The following craters are officially considered "unconfirmed" because they are not listed in the Earth Impact Database.  Due to stringent requirements regarding evidence and peer-reviewed publication, newly discovered craters or those with difficulty collecting evidence generally are known for some time before becoming listed.  However, entries on the unconfirmed list could still have an impact origin disproven.

See also 
 Impact craters
 Impact events
 Bolides and Meteorites
 Earth Impact Database – primary source
 Traces of Catastrophe book from Lunar and Planetary Institute - comprehensive reference on impact crater science

Notes

External links 
 Unesco
 Earth Impact Database – List of confirmed earth impact sites at the Planetary and Space Science Centre, University of New Brunswick
 Impact Database (formerly Suspected Earth Impact Sites list) maintained by David Rajmon for Impact Field Studies Group, USA

 
Australia
Lists of coordinates
Australia geology-related lists